Grant Gustin (born 1990) is an American actor.

Gustin may also refer to:

Jon Gustin (1932–1994), American professional golfer
Gustin House, an historic building in Saskatoon, Saskatchewan, Canada
Gustin Township, Michigan
Gustin, Michigan, an unincorporated community

See also
Gustine (disambiguation)
Guston (disambiguation)